The 1997 Tour de la Région Wallonne was the 24th edition of the Tour de Wallonie cycle race and was held on 1 August to 6 August 1997. The race started in Liège and finished in Saint-Hubert. The race was won by Thierry Marichal.

General classification

References

Tour de Wallonie
Tour de la Région Wallonne